V. R. Nedunchezhiyan (11 July 1920 – 12 January 2000) was an Indian politician and writer. He served thrice as the acting Chief Minister of the state of Tamil Nadu, India. He was also finance minister under the governments of C. N. Annadurai, M. Karunanidhi, M. G. Ramachandran and J. Jayalalithaa. For his literary contributions, he was also known as "Navalar" or the eloquent.

Life and career
Nedunchezhiyan was born at Thirukannapuram on 11 July 1920. He graduated with a master's degree and a doctorate in Tamil literature from Annamalai University. He became involved in politics while at the university and joined the Dravidar Kazhagam party in 1944. In 1949, he and C. N. Annadurai formed the Dravida Munnetra Kazhagam (DMK), with the latter as leader and Nedunchezhiyan acting as deputy general secretary until 1955. He was general secretary between 1955 and 1960 and then chairman of the party's general council until 1969.

Nedunchezhiyan was elected to the Legislative Assembly of Tamil Nadu in 1962, succeeding K. S. G. Haja Shareef, who moved to a different constituency. In 1967, he became the Minister of Education when the Dravida Munnetra Kazhagam took power. He was briefly acting Chief Minister for the state following C. N. Annadurai's death in 1969, taking the role until M. Karunanidhi was appointed. He then continued as a cabinet minister in the Karunanidhi cabinet until the DMK lost power in 1976.

Together with K. Rajaram, Nedunchezhiyan left the DMK to form a new political party called the Makkal Dravida Munnetra Kazhagam but this did not last long. The party merged with the All India Anna Dravida Munnetra Kazhagam (AIADMK), which was by then in government, in 1978 and from 1980 Nedunchezhiyan was again a cabinet minister, this time as a Minister of Finance under the leadership of AIADMK's M. G. Ramachandran, until 1987. Nedunchezhiyan acting as deputy general secretary as 1977 and 1989. He was general secretary as 1977 and 1989. He  became acting Chief Minister in 1988 when Ramachandran died.

Nedunchezhiyan briefly aligned himself with the J. Jayalalithaa-led group within the AIADMK but was expelled from the party in 1988 after disputes with its leaders. He stood in the 1989 state elections and later that year returned to the party fold after Jayalalithaa had successfully reunified it. He served as Minister of Finance again between 1991 and 1996.He was served General Council Leader Of AIADMK From 1996 to his death.

Legislative election history

Personal life
He married his wife, Visalakshi (AIADMK Spokesperson), in 1950, and they had one son.

Indian tennis player Jeevan Nedunchezhiyan is his grandson.

Death 
He died on heart failure at Apollo Hospital on 12 January 2000.At that time, Jayalalithaa sent a letter to Karunanidhi, who was the Chief Minister, asking for a place to bury Nedunchezhiyan next to Anna.But the then DMK government rejected that demand.  After this, Nedunchezhiyan's body was cremated in Besant Nagar cemetery.

In popular culture 
The character Madhivanan, played by Rajesh, in the 1997 film Iruvar is loosely based on Nedunchezhiyan.

Books published

Name of the book with year of publication.
 Decimal Research (1943)
 The Late Dravidian (1948)
 Language Struggle (1948)
 Repository (1948)
 Tears and Red Water Development Corporation (1951)
 Rise Murasu
 New Path
 Veera tamilgam
 Ancient Greek (1953)
 Giordano Bruno (1953)
 Charles Bradley (1953)
 Religion and Superstition (1955)
Purananooru Treasure (1961)
 DMK (1961)
Brotherhood with Anna (1961)
Heart great pleasure (1982)
 Thought Flowers (1982)
 Learning love scenes
 Narrinai katcigal (1982)
 Telling Taste (Short Views) (1985)
 Culture Honor (1985)
 Novel Announcements to the Novel Country (1988)
Vadakkalathur Raja Gopalanar Biography (1991)
 Thirukkural - Novel Clarification (1991)
Biography of #RevolutionaryBharatidasan (1994)
 War of Social Justice (1996)
 History of the Dravidian Movement (Part I) (1996)
 Jain Commission Report - A Study (1997)
 What I Saw and Heard in Life (2000)
After His- # Thirukkural Novel Text (Portable Edition) (2001)
 The parable of the sower (2004)

See also 
First Nedunchezhiyan ministry
Second Nedunchezhiyan ministry
Pleasant Stay hotel case

Notes

References

 Tamil Nadu Legislative Assembly

1920 births
2000 deaths
Chief Ministers of Tamil Nadu
Leaders of the Opposition in Tamil Nadu
Chief ministers from Dravida Munnetra Kazhagam
Chief ministers from All India Anna Dravida Munnetra Kazhagam
People from Nagapattinam district
Tirukkural commentators
Recipients of the Thiruvalluvar Award
Madras MLAs 1962–1967
Tamil Nadu MLAs 1967–1972
Tamil Nadu MLAs 1971–1976
Tamil Nadu MLAs 1977–1980
Tamil Nadu MLAs 1980–1984
Tamil Nadu MLAs 1985–1989
Tamil Nadu MLAs 1991–1996
Indian politicians convicted of corruption